Elwyn Friedrich (25 July 1933 – 2 February 2012) was a Swiss ice hockey player. He competed at the 1964 Winter Olympics.

References

External links
 

1933 births
2012 deaths
Ice hockey players at the 1964 Winter Olympics
Olympic ice hockey players of Switzerland
Sportspeople from Thurgau